The tapping nursery frog (Cophixalus aenigma) is a species of frog in the family Microhylidae.

It is endemic to Australia.
Its natural habitats are subtropical or tropical moist lowland forests and subtropical or tropical moist montane forests.

Sources

Cophixalus
Amphibians of Queensland
Amphibians described in 2004
Taxonomy articles created by Polbot
Frogs of Australia